Harabarjan Rural District is in the Central District of Marvast County, Yazd province, Iran. At the National Census of 2006, its population was 2,686 in 786 households, when it was in the former Marvast District of Khatam County. There were 2,462 inhabitants in 704 households at the following census of 2011. At the most recent census of 2016, the population of the rural district was 3,247 in 1,007 households. The largest of its 175 villages was Torkan, with 1,332 people. After the census, Marvast District was elevated to the status of a county and split into two districts.

References 

Rural Districts of Yazd Province

Populated places in Yazd Province